The Eritrea national under-15 football team represents Eritrea in tournaments and friendly matches at the under-15 level.  The team hosted the first-ever CECAFA U-15 Championship in 2019.

Competitive record

List of matches

2019 CECAFA U-15 Championship

References

External links
ENFF official website

Under-15
African national association football teams
African national under-15 association football teams
National under-15 association football teams